The negation of the Diaspora (shlilat ha'galut, or , shlilat ha'golah) is a central assumption in many currents of Zionism. The concept encourages the dedication to Zionism and it is used to justify the denial of the feasibility of Jewish emancipation in the Diaspora. Life in the Diaspora would either lead to discrimination and persecution or to national decadence and assimilation. A more moderate formulation says that the Jews as a people have no future without a "spiritual center" in the Land of Israel.

Before 1948
According to Schweid, in the early twentieth century, Yosef Haim Brenner and Micha Josef Berdyczewski advocated an extreme form of the concept. In his literary work, Brenner describes Jews in the Pale of Settlement as poor, mentally, morally and spiritually disfigured, panicky, humiliated, disoriented, with no realistic view of life, depressed, despised, slovenly of dress, lacking taste, unwilling to defend themselves against violence, desperate, and feeling at the same time inferior and part of a Chosen People. According to Schweid, Brenner thought that that despair was good, as it would leave Zionism as their only option.

Yehezkel Kaufmann saw Jews in the Diaspora as territorially assimilated, religiously segregated and in other matters semi-assimilated, with even their languages often a mixture of Hebrew and the local language. Kaufmann viewed this Diaspora culture as flawed, misshapen, poor and restricted. Although Diaspora Jews could assimilate more easily now that the Jewish ghettos had been abolished and the larger cultures were becoming more secular, European cultures remained essentially Christian.

Ahad Ha'am and A.D. Gordon held a more moderate view in that they still saw some positive traits or possibilities in life in the Diaspora. As he thought the creation of a homeland in Palestine would take several generations, Ahad Ha'am wanted to improve life in the Diaspora by creating a "spiritual center" in Palestine. This would give Jews more self-confidence and help them resist assimilation, which he saw as a deformation of the personality  and a moral failing in regards to family and people. He believed Jews should feel historical continuity and organic belonging to a people. Gordon perceived nature as an organic unity. He preferred organic bonds in society, like those of family, community and nation, over "mechanical" bonds, like those of state, party and class. Since Jews were cut off from their nation, they were cut off from the experience of sanctity, and the existential bond with the infinite. In the Diaspora, a Jew was cut off from direct contact with nature. Gordon wrote:

[W]e are a parasitic people. We have no roots in the soil, there is no ground beneath our feet. And we are parasites not only in an economic sense, but in spirit, in thought, in poetry, in literature, and in our virtues, our ideals, our higher human aspirations. Every alien movement sweeps us along, every wind in the world carries us. We in ourselves are almost non-existent, so of course we are nothing in the eyes of other people either.

The poet Hayyim Nahman Bialik wrote:

And my heart weeps for my unhappy people ...
How burned, how blasted must our portion be,
If seed like this is withered in its soil. ...

According to Schweid, Bialik meant that the "seed" was the potential of the Jewish people, which they preserved in the Diaspora, where it could only give rise to deformed results. However, once conditions changed, the "seed" could still give a plentiful harvest. Schweid says the concept of the organic unity of the nation is the common denominator of Ahad Ha'am's, Gordon's and Bialik's views, which prevents them from completely rejecting life in the Diaspora.

Zeev Sternhell distinguishes two schools of thought in Zionism. One was the liberal or utilitarian school of Theodor Herzl and Max Nordau. Especially after the Dreyfus Affair they held that anti-Semitism would never disappear, and saw Zionism as a rational solution for Jews. The other school, prevalent among the Zionists in Palestine, saw Zionism as a project to rescue the Jewish nation and not as a project to rescue Jews. Zionism was a matter of the "Rebirth of the Nation". In "Rebirth and Destiny of ISRAEL", a collection of speeches and assays by David Ben-Gurion, he describes his horror after discovering, shortly after his arrival in Palestine in 1906, that a moshava (a private Jewish agricultural settlement) employed Arabs as guards: "Was it conceivable that here too we should be deep in Galuth (exile), hiring strangers to guard our property and protect our lives?" The question of security, apart from the shame of Jewish inability to defend their lives and honor during pogroms, was not central to their thinking. For instance, in 1940, Katznelson wrote about Polish Jews in areas conquered by the Soviet Union: "[They] are unable to fight even for a few days for small things like Hebrew schools. In my opinion that is a terrible tragedy, no less than the trampling of Jewry by Hitler's Jackboots."

According to Frankel, some Zionists of the Second Aliyah, like Ya'akov Zerubavel, advocated a new Jewish mentality that would replace the old one. The old mentality, the Galut (exile) mentality, was one of passivity, of awaiting salvation from the Heavens. According to Zerubavel, after the final defeat of Bar Kochba by the Romans began "the tragedy of our passivity." For him, to work the soil in Eretz Israel, to settle the country and to defend the settlements, was a complete break with Exile and meant picking up the thread where it had been dropped after the national defeat by the Romans in the first century C.E. The Jew with the new mentality would fight to defend himself. According to Ben-Gurion, "to act as guard in Eretz Israel is the boldest and freest deed in Zionism." Zerubavel wrote that the remark by which a fallen guard, Yehezkel Ninasov, was remembered, revealed the image of being guard in all its glory. Ninasov had once said: "How is it that you are still alive and your animals are gone? Shame on you!". According to Brenner, "[the pioneers in Palestine are] a new type among the Jews".

In an address to the youth section of the Mapai political party in 1944 Ben-Gurion said:

Exile is one with utter dependence - in material things, in politics and culture, in ethics and intellect, and they must be dependent who are an alien minority, who have no Homeland and are separated from their origins, from the soil and labor, from economic creativity. So we must become the captains of our fortunes, we must become independent - not only in politics and economy but in spirit, feeling and will.

According to Sternhell, the Zionist views underlying the negation of the Diaspora, e.g., the view of the Jews as a parasitic people, were often quite similar to the views underlying modern European anti-Semitism.

Hebrew revival
According to Itamar Even-Zohar, in the late 19th century, secular Jews in Eastern Europe saw Jewish culture as in a state of decline or even degeneration. Some wanted to assimilate completely. The Zionists sought a return to the "purity" and "authenticity" of the existence of the "Hebrew nation in its land", a pastoral vision reflecting contemporary romantic ideals.

This vision manifested itself by counterposing "new Hebrew" to "old Diaspora Jew" in various ways. Even-Zohar mentions several:
 the transition to physical labor, mainly agriculture or "working the land", as it was called;
 self-defense and the concomitant use of arms;
 the supplanting of the old, "contemptible" Diaspora language, Yiddish, with a new tongue, "authentic" Hebrew, adopting the Sephardi rather than the Ashkenazi pronunciation;
 discarding traditionally European dress and adopting other, Middle Eastern fashions, like the Bedouin-Circassian; and
 dropping Eastern European family names (often based on German or Russian) and adopting Hebrew ones instead.

This rejection of the Diaspora, for some such as the Canaanites (who originated from the Revisionist school of thought), extended to the rejection of the close and intimate ties between the culture practiced by most self-identified Jews, and the reclaiming of Jewish culture as a "Hebrew culture" that would become agnostic to religious affiliation, rely upon the land of Israel and its ancient cultures as a prime factor in self-identification as a Hebrew rather than as Jew, and even seek for assimilation of the Arab residents into the larger Hebrew culture. This extreme negation of both the Diaspora and Judaism would not become popular among even secular Zionists, but it would continue to resurface in nationalistic thought to the present day.

Ze'ev Jabotinsky, the founder of Revisionist Zionism, is famous for summarizing the attitude, "Eliminate the Diaspora, or the Diaspora will surely eliminate you."

After 1948
According to Schweid, since about 1970, the idea of the negation of the Diaspora was removed from the basic premises guiding national education in Israel. One reason for this was the need of the State of Israel to "reconcile" itself with Jews in the Diaspora.

In 2007, the Israeli government started a campaign to encourage Jews in Germany from the former Soviet Union to emigrate to Israel, in order, according to the decision of the Israeli Cabinet, to "counter [their] dangerous assimilation".

The anti-Diaspora position is present within the Israeli literature to this day, with A. B. Yehoshua being considered chief of this sentimental strain; Yehoshua has often been recorded or cited as critical of Diaspora Judaism as being inauthentic and rootless in comparison to Israeli Judaism, and the Judaism-tinged Diaspora existence as being stifling to the identity and conviviality of secular Jewish culture.

Criticism

Criticism of the concept of negation of the Diaspora argues that theory is blatantly false, by pointing to the longevity of the Diaspora. The influence of Judaism as a cultural unifying agent of the Jewish people in comparison to the modern state's youth is also mentioned as a central argument against it. Criticism may be of both a religious and secular nature, with the religious criticisms focusing on both the disempowerment of religious institutions as markers and unifiers of Jewish identity and the reduction of reliance upon religion for guidance, and the secular criticisms focusing on how the idea of Zionism poses a counterweight to the encouragement of assimilation, integration and "normalization" of more secularized Jewish minorities into larger cultures outside Israel.

See also

Jewish question
Muscular Judaism
Nation-building
Golus nationalism
Zionist antisemitism

Footnotes

Bibliography
Ben-Gurion, 1959, 'Rebirth and destiny of Israel', Thomas Yoseloff Ltd., London
E. Schweid, 'Rejection of the Diaspora in Zionist Thought', in 'Essential Papers on Zionism', ed. By Reinharz & Shapira, 1996, 
Z. Sternhell, The founding myths of Israel: nationalism, socialism, and the making of the Jewish state. Princeton, NJ: Princeton University Press, 1998. p. 3-36. 

Zionism
Expulsions of Jews
Jewish diaspora
Aliyah